Atticus (fl. c. 175 AD) was an ancient Platonic philosopher who lived in the second century of the Christian era, under the emperor Marcus Aurelius. All that is known of him comes from the fragments of his book preserved in Eusebius' Preparatio Evangelica.

"Porphyry makes mention of the ύπομνήματα [memos] of a Platonic Atticus, but they may have been written by Herodes Atticus." However, Guthrie (1918) was of the opinion that the 'memos' were commentaries of Atticus the Platonic philosopher read by Plotinus in his lectures.

Atticus was vehemently anti-Peripatetic. His work was a polemic, possibly originating from the first holder of the Platonic philosophy chair at Athens under Marcus Aurelius.

It is not clear whether the polemic had a philosophical or a political motivation. Atticus insisted that Aristotle was an atheist, that he denied the existence of the soul, and that he rejected divine providence.

Atticus' position represents a version of Platonism according to which deviation from the literal word of the master means irredeemable heretical opposition. This version turns up occasionally in contemporary scholarship, as much in the writings of Aristotle's defenders as in those of Plato's defenders.

See also 
Numenius of Apamea

Citations

References 
 George E. Karamanolis, Plato and Aristotle in Agreement? Platonists on Aristotle From Antiochus to Porphyry, Oxford University Press, 2006, .

2nd-century Romans
2nd-century philosophers
Middle Platonists
Ancient Roman philosophers
Roman-era philosophers in Athens